The Romantic Young Lady is a 1923 English language play adaptation from Gregorio Martinez Sierra's 1918 Sueño de Una Noche de Agosto ("Dream of an August Night"), translated by Helen and Harley Granville-Barker. The comedy of manners, written in three acts, is set in Madrid. It features a romantic heroine, a sophisticated hero, and a thrice-married grandmother.

References

External links
 Full text of The Romantic Young Lady at HathiTrust Digital Library
 

1923 plays
Comedy plays
Plays set in Spain
English-language plays
Plays based on other plays